In statistics and signal processing, a minimum mean square error (MMSE) estimator is an estimation method which minimizes the mean square error (MSE), which is a common measure of estimator quality, of the fitted values of a dependent variable. In the Bayesian setting, the term MMSE more specifically refers to estimation with quadratic loss function. In such case, the MMSE estimator is given by the posterior mean of the parameter to be estimated. Since the posterior mean is cumbersome to calculate, the form of the MMSE estimator is usually constrained to be within a certain class of functions. Linear MMSE estimators are a popular choice since they are easy to use, easy to calculate, and very versatile. It has given rise to many popular estimators such as the Wiener–Kolmogorov filter and Kalman filter.

Motivation
The term MMSE more specifically refers to estimation in a Bayesian setting with quadratic cost function. The basic idea behind the Bayesian approach to estimation stems from practical situations where we often have some prior information about the parameter to be estimated. For instance, we may have prior information about the range that the parameter can assume; or we may have an old estimate of the parameter that we want to modify when a new observation is made available; or the statistics of an actual random signal such as speech. This is in contrast to the non-Bayesian approach like minimum-variance unbiased estimator (MVUE) where absolutely nothing is assumed to be known about the parameter in advance and which does not account for such situations. In the Bayesian approach, such prior information is captured by the prior probability density function of the parameters; and based directly on Bayes theorem, it allows us to make better posterior estimates as more observations become available. Thus unlike non-Bayesian approach where parameters of interest are assumed to be deterministic, but unknown constants, the Bayesian estimator seeks to estimate a parameter that is itself a random variable. Furthermore, Bayesian estimation can also deal with situations where the sequence of observations are not necessarily independent. Thus Bayesian estimation provides yet another alternative to the MVUE. This is useful when the MVUE does not exist or cannot be found.

Definition
Let  be a  hidden random vector variable, and let  be a  known random vector variable (the measurement or observation), both of them not necessarily of the same dimension.

 

Note that MSE can equivalently be defined in other ways, since

The MMSE estimator is then defined as the estimator achieving minimal MSE:

Properties
 When the means and variances are finite, the MMSE estimator is uniquely defined and is given by:

In other words, the MMSE estimator is the conditional expectation of  given the known observed value of the measurements. Also, since  is the posterior mean, the error covariance matrix is equal to the posterior covariance  matrix, 
.
 The MMSE estimator is unbiased (under the regularity assumptions mentioned above):

 The MMSE estimator is asymptotically unbiased and it converges in distribution to the normal distribution:

Thus, the MMSE estimator is asymptotically efficient.
 The orthogonality principle: When  is a scalar, an estimator constrained to be of certain form  is an optimal estimator, i.e.  if and only if
 
for all  in closed, linear subspace  of the measurements. For random vectors, since the MSE for estimation of a random vector is the sum of the MSEs of the coordinates, finding the MMSE estimator of a random vector decomposes into finding the MMSE estimators of the coordinates of X separately:
 
for all i and j. More succinctly put, the cross-correlation between the minimum estimation error  and the estimator  should be zero,

This can be directly shown using the Bayes theorem. As a consequence, to find the MMSE estimator, it is sufficient to find the linear MMSE estimator.

Linear MMSE estimator
In many cases, it is not possible to determine the analytical expression of the MMSE estimator. Two basic numerical approaches to obtain the MMSE estimate depends on either finding the conditional expectation  or finding the minima of MSE. Direct numerical evaluation of the conditional expectation is computationally expensive since it often requires multidimensional integration usually done via Monte Carlo methods. Another computational approach is to directly seek the minima of the MSE using techniques such as the stochastic gradient descent methods ; but this method still requires the evaluation of expectation. While these numerical methods have been fruitful, a closed form expression for the MMSE estimator is nevertheless possible if we are willing to make some compromises.

One possibility is to abandon the full optimality requirements and seek a technique minimizing the MSE within a particular class of estimators, such as the class of linear estimators. The linear MMSE estimator is the estimator achieving minimum MSE among all estimators of such form. That is, it solves the following the optimization problem: 

The form of the linear estimator does not depend on the type of the assumed underlying distribution.

 

Thus, the expression for linear MMSE estimator, its mean, and its auto-covariance is given by

Lastly, the error covariance and minimum mean square error achievable by such estimator is

It is required that the MMSE estimator be unbiased. This means,

Thus we can re-write the estimator as

and the expression for estimation error becomes

From the orthogonality principle, we can have , where we take . Here the left-hand-side term is

Thus the full expression for the linear MMSE estimator is

Lastly, the covariance of linear MMSE estimation error will then be given by

The first term in the third line is zero due to the orthogonality principle. Since , we can re-write  in terms of covariance matrices as

This we can recognize to be the same as  Thus the minimum mean square error achievable by such a linear estimator is

.

Univariate case 

 

The above two equations allows us to interpret the correlation coefficient either as normalized slope of linear regression 

or as square root of the ratio of two variances 

.

Computation
A more numerically stable method is provided by QR decomposition method. Since the matrix  is a symmetric positive definite matrix,  can be solved twice as fast with the Cholesky decomposition, while for large sparse systems conjugate gradient method is more effective. Levinson recursion is a fast method when  is also a Toeplitz matrix. This can happen when  is a wide sense stationary process. In such stationary cases, these estimators are also referred to as Wiener–Kolmogorov filters.

Linear MMSE estimator for linear observation process
Here the required mean and the covariance matrices will be

 

Thus the expression for the linear MMSE estimator matrix  further modifies to

Lastly, the error covariance is

The significant difference between the estimation problem treated above and those of least squares and Gauss–Markov estimate is that the number of observations m, (i.e. the dimension of ) need not be at least as large as the number of unknowns, n, (i.e. the dimension of ). The estimate for the linear observation process exists so long as the m-by-m matrix  exists; this is the case for any m if, for instance,  is positive definite. Physically the reason for this property is that since  is now a random variable, it is possible to form a meaningful estimate (namely its mean) even with no measurements. Every new measurement simply provides additional information which may modify our original estimate. Another feature of this estimate is that for m < n, there need be no measurement error. Lastly, this technique can handle cases where the noise is correlated.

Alternative form
An alternative form of expression can be obtained by using the matrix identity

 
and

In this form the above expression can be easily compared with weighed least square and Gauss–Markov estimate.

Sequential linear MMSE estimation
In many real-time applications, observational data is not available in a single batch. Instead the observations are made in a sequence. One possible approach is to use the sequential observations to update an old estimate as additional data becomes available, leading to finer estimates. One crucial difference between batch estimation and sequential estimation is that sequential estimation requires an additional Markov assumption. 

In the Bayesian framework, such recursive estimation is easily facilitated using Bayes' rule.

Note that the prior density for k-th time step is the posterior density of (k-1)-th time step. This structure allows us to formulate a recursive approach to estimation.

 

This is the Markov assumption. 

The MMSE estimate  given the th observation is then the mean of the posterior density . Here, we have implicitly assumed that the statistical properties of  does not change with time. In other words,  is stationary.

In the context of linear MMSE estimator, the formula for the estimate will have the same form as before.

The mean and covariance matrix of the prior density  is given by the previous MMSE estimate, and the error covariance matrix, 

 

respectively, as per by the property of MMSE estimators. 

.

.

Lastly, we replace  by 

Thus, we have the new estimate as

and the new error covariance as 

From the point of view of linear algebra, for sequential estimation, if we have an estimate  based on measurements generating space , then after receiving another set of measurements, we should subtract out from these measurements that part that could be anticipated from the result of the first measurements. In other words, the updating must be based on that part of the new data which is orthogonal to the old data.

The repeated use of the above two equations as more observations become available lead to recursive estimation techniques. The expressions can be more compactly written as

The matrix  is often referred to as the Kalman gain factor. The alternative formulation of the above algorithm will give

The repetition of these three steps as more data becomes available leads to an iterative estimation algorithm. The generalization of this idea to non-stationary cases gives rise to the Kalman filter. The three update steps outlined above indeed form the update step of the Kalman filter.

Special case: scalar observations
After (k+1)-th observation, the direct use of above recursive equations give the expression for the estimate  as:

where  is the new scalar observation and the gain factor  is n-by-1 column vector given by 
 
The  is n-by-n error covariance matrix given by

Here, no matrix inversion is required. Also, the gain factor, depends on our confidence in the new data sample, as measured by the noise variance, versus that in the previous data.

Alternative approaches: This important special case has also given rise to many other iterative methods (or adaptive filters), such as the least mean squares filter and recursive least squares filter, that directly solves the original MSE optimization problem using stochastic gradient descents. However, since the estimation error  cannot be directly observed, these methods try to minimize the mean squared prediction error . For instance, in the case of scalar observations, we have the gradient  Thus, the update equation for the least mean square filter is given by

where  is the scalar step size and the expectation is approximated by the instantaneous value . As we can see, these methods bypass the need for covariance matrices.

Examples

Example 1
We shall take a linear prediction problem as an example. Let a linear combination of observed scalar random variables   and  be used to estimate another future scalar random variable  such that . If the random variables  are real Gaussian random variables with zero mean and its covariance matrix given by

then our task is to find the coefficients  such that it will yield an optimal linear estimate .

In terms of the terminology developed in the previous sections, for this problem we have the observation vector , the estimator matrix  as a row vector, and the estimated variable  as a scalar quantity. The autocorrelation matrix  is defined as

The cross correlation matrix  is defined as

We now solve the equation  by inverting  and pre-multiplying to get

So we have   and 
Computing the minimum
mean square error then gives . The matrix equation can be solved by well known methods such as Gauss elimination method. A shorter, non-numerical example can be found in orthogonality principle.

Example 2
Consider a vector  formed by taking  observations of a fixed but unknown scalar parameter  disturbed by white Gaussian noise. We can describe the process by a linear equation , where . Depending on context it will be clear if  represents a scalar or a vector. Let the noise vector  be normally distributed as  where  is an identity matrix. It is easy to see that 

Thus, the linear MMSE estimator is given by

where for  we have 

Similarly, the variance of the estimator is

Thus the MMSE of this linear estimator is

For very large , we see that the MMSE estimator of a scalar with uniform aprior distribution can be approximated by the arithmetic average of all the observed data 
 
while the variance will be unaffected by data  and the LMMSE of the estimate will tend to zero.

However, the estimator is suboptimal since it is constrained to be linear. Had the random variable  also been Gaussian, then the estimator would have been optimal.

Example 3 
Consider a variation of the above example: Two candidates are standing for an election. The first poll revealed that the candidate is likely to get  fraction of votes. Since some error is always present due to finite sampling and the particular polling methodology adopted, the first pollster declares their estimate to have an error  with zero mean and variance  Similarly, the second pollster declares their estimate to be  with an error  with zero mean and variance  Note that except for the mean and variance of the error, the error distribution is unspecified. How should the two polls be combined to obtain the voting prediction for the given candidate?

As with previous example, we have

where the weights are given by

Here, since the denominator term is constant, the poll with lower error is given higher weight in order to predict the election outcome.

which makes  smaller than  Thus, the LMMSE is given by 

Example 4
Suppose that a musician is playing an instrument and that the sound is received by two microphones, each of them located at two different places. Let  denote the sound produced by the musician, which is a random variable with zero mean and variance  How should the recorded music from these two microphones be combined, after being synced with each other?

We can model the sound received by each microphone as

Thus, we can combine the two sounds as 

where the i-th weight is given as

See also
Bayesian estimator
Mean squared error
Least squares
Minimum-variance unbiased estimator (MVUE)
Orthogonality principle
Wiener filter
Kalman filter
Linear prediction
Zero-forcing equalizer

Notes

Further reading

 
 
 
 
 
 
 

Statistical deviation and dispersion
Point estimation performance
Signal estimation